KHM could refer to:
Khamti Airport, IATA airport code
Khmer language, ISO 639 code
Cambodia, ISO 3166-1 alpha-3 code
KHM (band), later the Clayborne Family

KHM is an abbreviation of:
King's Harbour Master
Kinder-und Hausmärchen, code for stories in Grimms' Fairy Tales
Kulturhistorisk Museum, University of Oslo, Norway